Zuhair Ramadan (21 June 1959 – 17 November 2021) was a Syrian actor.

Biography
He graduated from the Higher Institute of Dramatic Arts in Damascus in 1983. He became a member of the Syrian Artists Syndicate the same year.

He was elected chairman of Syrian Artists Syndicate on 10 October 2014, and became a member of the People's Assembly for the 2016 session.

Controversy
Ramadan had a number of controversial statements and decisions after he took over the chairmanship of the syndicate in 2014, among which he dismissed several artists for failing to pay the fees. Ramadan was also considered one of the strongest supporters of the Assad government.

Death
Ramadan died Wednesday evening, 17 November 2021, at the age of 62, after suffering a severe pneumonitis, according to the Ministry of Information.

References

1959 births
2021 deaths
People from Latakia
20th-century Syrian male actors
21st-century Syrian male actors
Higher Institute of Dramatic Arts (Damascus) alumni
Syrian male television actors